The Kilkenny-Waterford rivalry is a hurling rivalry between Irish county teams Kilkenny and Waterford, who first played each other in 1957. In spite of the infrequent nature of the meetings, it is considered to be one of the most intense rivalry matches in Gaelic games. Kilkenny's home ground is Nowlan Park and Waterford's home ground is Walsh Park, however, all of their championship meetings have been held at neutral venues, usually Croke Park.

While Kilkenny have the highest number of All-Ireland and Leinster titles, Waterford have enjoyed success at sporadic intervals throughout their history winning just two All-Ireland titles.

Roots

History

Kilkenny are one of the most successful teams in the championship, having captured thirty six All-Ireland titles, and together with Cork and Tipperary form hurling's 'Big Three'.  Waterford, on the other hand, have had sporadic periods of success throughout championship history resulting in two only All-Ireland titles.  After a golden age for the team in the 1950s and 1960s Waterford went into severe decline in subsequent decades.

The Kilkenny – Waterford hurling rivalry first began in 1957 with their first meeting in the All-Ireland Hurling Final.  Kilkenny won on a scoreline of 4–10 to 3–12.  Two years later, in 1959, the teams played out a draw.  Until 2012, this had been the last drawn game in the All-Ireland Hurling Final.  The replay saw Waterford win their 2nd, and last to date All-Ireland Hurling Championship.  The game was also notable for the Kilkenny debut of Eddie Keher.  The two teams also met in the 1963 Final, with Kilkenny winning.  This would be the last game between the two teams for 35 years.

During the 1990s and 2000s, Waterford hurling experienced a resurgence after the dark periods of the 1970s and 1980s.  Waterford met Kilkenny in two semi-finals in both 1998 and 2004, with Waterford losing in two close battles.  Having not played in a final since 1963, Waterford again met Kilkenny in the 2008 All-Ireland Senior Hurling Championship Final. Since then, the two teams have met in three Semi-finals and a qualifier. Kilkenny were triumphant on all occasions except 2016 where the sides drew.

Outside hurling
The intensity of the rivalry has also been stoked outside hurling.  The two counties share a border, splitting the village of Ferrybank in two. Future expansion of County Waterford into County Kilkenny has been muted which has heightened the rivalry.

Statistics

Inter-county results

Legend

Senior

Under-21

Minor

Club results

Senior

Records

Scorelines

 Biggest championship win:
 For Kilkenny: Kilkenny 3–30 – 1–13 Waterford, 2008 All-Ireland final, Croke Park, 7 September 2008
 For Waterford: Waterford 3–12 – 1–10 Kilkenny, 1959 All-Ireland final replay, Croke Park, 4 October 1959
 Highest aggregate:
 Waterford 4–23 – 2–22 Kilkenny, 2017 All-Ireland qualifier, Semple Stadium, 8 July 2017

Most appearances

Top scorers

Top scorer in a single game:
For Kilkenny: 2–12
 T. J. Reid, Kilkenny 2–22 – 4–23, All-Ireland qualifier, Semple Stadium, 8 July 2017
For Waterford: 0–13
 Paul Flynn, Waterford 0–18 – 3–12 Kilkenny, 2004 All-Ireland semi-final, Croke Park, 8 August 2004

References

External links
 All-time Kilkenny-Waterford results

Waterford
Waterford county hurling team rivalries